"I Am Yours" is a song performed by Austrian band The Makemakes. The song represented Austria in the Eurovision Song Contest 2015 where it finished in joint last place, scoring zero points and therefore becoming the first host country in the history of the contest to score no points. It was released as a digital download in Austria on 6 March 2015 as the lead single from their debut self-titled studio album The Makemakes (2015). The song was written by Jimmy Harry, Dominic Muhrer, Paul Estrela, Florian Meindl and Markus Christ. The song has peaked at number 2 on the Austrian Singles Chart.

Live performances
The song was performed for the first time during show 3 of Wer singt für Österreich?, the Austrian national selection process for the Eurovision Song Contest 2015 in Vienna, Austria. It was one of the two potential songs by the Makemakes for Eurovision, along with "Big Bang". "I Am Yours" advanced to the final, where it was performed again. Eventually, The Makemakes were selected to represent Austria in the Eurovision Song Contest 2015. On 23 May 2015, The Makemakes performed the song live during the final of the Eurovision Song Contest 2015 at the Wiener Stadthalle in Vienna, Austria, receiving zero points; it is the first Eurovision song from a host country to have done so. They later released a video on Twitter of them parodying the winning song, changing the lyrics to "We are the zeroes of our time".

The Eurovision performance was memorable for the appearance of a piano on stage that was designed to burst into flames midway through the song. This was one of the many Eurovision moments referenced in the parody song "Love Love Peace Peace", performed during the interval of the 2016 Eurovision final.

Charts

Release history

References

2014 songs
2015 singles
The Makemakes songs
Eurovision songs of Austria
Eurovision songs of 2015
Eurovision songs that scored no points
Songs written by Jimmy Harry